Patriot Parliament is the name commonly used for the Irish Parliament session called by King James II during the Williamite War in Ireland which lasted from 1688 to 1691. The first since 1666, it held only one session, which lasted from 7 May 1689 to 20 July 1689.

The House of Commons was 70 members short since there were no elections in the northern counties; as a result, its members were overwhelmingly Old English and Catholic. Sir Richard Nagle was elected speaker while the House of Lords was led by Baron Fitton; the opposition was led by Anthony Dopping, a Church of Ireland cleric who served as the Bishop of Meath.

Irish nationalist historian Sir Charles Gavan Duffy first used the term Patriot Parliament in 1893 but in reality, it was deeply divided. The deliberate destruction of its records after 1695 mean assessments, both negative and positive, often rely on individual accounts.

Background

Despite his Catholicism, James II became king in 1685 with widespread support in all three kingdoms of England, Scotland and Ireland, largely due to fear of civil war if he were bypassed; by 1688, it seemed only his removal could prevent one. He was ousted by William III and his wife Mary II in the November 1688 Glorious Revolution, and went into exile in France, where he was sheltered by Louis XIV.

Louis wanted to absorb English resources from the European conflict known as the Nine Years' War; the cheapest way to do this was a war in Ireland, where support for James was highest. Since England was his primary objective, James was extremely reluctant, but the French insisted and he landed in Ireland on 12 March 1689. Of the Irish people, 800,000 were Catholic, nearly 75% of the population, who supported James due to his own Catholicism; 75,000 were members of the Protestant Church of Ireland, many of whom were sympathisers. The third group of 200,000 nonconformists were concentrated in Ulster, where they comprised nearly 50% of the population; hopes of gaining their support quickly faded.

For many Catholics, the most pressing issues were the removal of penal laws restricting their ability to hold public office, and land reform. The proportion owned by Irish Catholics declined from 90% in 1600 to 22% by 1685, most of it concentrated in the hands of the Catholic Old English elite. There was also a small middle class of Catholic and Protestant merchants, who objected to commercial restrictions imposed on Irish trade, policies continued by James prior to his exile.

Demands for greater autonomy by those allied with the Earl of Tyrconnell clashed with James' vision of a unitary state of England, Scotland and Ireland, where the role of Parliament and the church was simply to obey their monarch. Contrary to normal practice, James also claimed the right to appoint Catholic bishops and clergy in his kingdoms, which caused conflict with Pope Innocent XI.

Irish Catholic support for James was based on his religion and willingness to deliver their demands. In 1685, Gaelic poet Dáibhí Ó Bruadair celebrated his accession as ensuring the supremacy of Catholicism and the Irish language. Tyrconnell's expansion of the army by the creation of Catholic regiments was welcomed by Diarmuid Mac Carthaigh, as enabling the native Irish 'Tadhg' to be armed and to assert their dominance over 'John' the English Protestant.

Conversely, most Irish Protestants viewed his policies as designed to "utterly ruin the Protestant interest and the English interest in Ireland". While James hoped to attract their support, Jacobitism was restricted to "doctrinaire Protestant clergymen, disgruntled Tory landowners and Catholic converts", who viewed his removal as unlawful. While many were sympathetic, only a few Church of Ireland ministers refused to swear allegiance to the new regime and became Non-Jurors; the most famous was propagandist Charles Leslie.

Composition

In March 1689, James landed in Ireland and issued writs for the first Irish Parliament since 1666. Tyrconnell ensured a predominately Catholic electorate by issuing new borough charters, that added Catholics to city corporations, and removed "disloyal members", many Protestant. The war prevented elections being held in Fermanagh and Donegal, leaving the Commons seventy MPs short; six were Protestant, 224 Catholic.

Sir Richard Nagle, a wealthy lawyer and close ally of Tyrconnell, acted as leader of the Commons. The Lords was led by Baron Fitton, who spent 1664 to 1684 imprisoned for criminal libel; allegedly selected by James because he was a Protestant, he promptly converted to Catholicism. The Lords included five Protestant peers, the most prominent being Viscount Mountjoy, and four bishops from the Church of Ireland, the Bishop of Meath serving as leader of the opposition.

A French diplomat observed James had 'a heart too English to do anything that might vex the English'. He viewed the Irish campaign as a distraction from regaining the English throne, and as concessions to Irish Catholics cost him support from Protestants in England and Scotland, he made them with reluctance.

This meant although Tyrconnell was personally loyal to James, the Catholic minority who benefited from the 1662 Land Settlement mistrusted him. Led by the Earl of Limerick, they wanted to negotiate from strength, and retain the gains made under Tyrconnell. Some purchased lands confiscated in 1652, including Tyrconnell, Limerick and James himself; this placed them in opposition to those who wanted the position reset to 1641, and an end to their exclusion from government positions. While a minority in Parliament, they were a majority in the country.

Traditionally, these differences were presented as an ethnic division between Irish Gaels and Old English; in 1692, Jacobite historian Charles Kelly claimed Tyrconnell fatally weakened the cause by his opposition to the Gaels. There is some truth in this, particularly as Parliament failed to address compensation for estates confiscated prior to 1641, much of it from Gaelic landowners in Ulster. Modern historians argue differences were based primarily on economics, although those who benefitted from the 1662 Settlement were mostly Old English, those who had not, mostly Gaelic.

Key legislation
The 1689 Parliament "ended up going much further than James would have liked, while ... falling short of what many Irish Catholics hoped for." Called in order to raise funds for the war, Parliament approved a subsidy of £20,000 per month, for 13 months but had no way to raise the funds.

The Act of Recognition recognised James's right to the Crown of Ireland and compared the usurpation by William III to the murder of James' father Charles I. It emphasised indefeasible hereditary rights and the Divine right of kings; these contradicted the 1689 English Bill of Rights and Scottish Articles of Grievances, which made explicit an assumed Social contract between a king and his subjects.

The Declaratory Act affirmed the Kingdom of Ireland as always having been "distinct" from England, and no Act of the English Parliament was binding unless ratified by the Irish Parliament. However, Poynings' Law, remained on the books; created in 1494, this effectively allowed the English Parliament to legislate for Ireland and James was unwilling to repeal it.

Land Settlement: despite opposition in the Lords from Protestants, and the small number of Catholics who had purchased land since 1660, Parliament refused to approve taxes until James agreed to repeal the 1652 Cromwellian Settlement and Act of Settlement 1662. However, it failed to address compensation for estates confiscated prior to 1641, many held by Gaelic landowners, particularly those lost after Tyrone's Rebellion in 1603.

A Bill of Attainder named 2,470 Protestants as traitors, subject to confiscation of property and their lives. While many viewed this as unwise, it was the only way to raise money for the taxes voted by Parliament; after defeat, it was used to justify a new round of confiscations.

An Act for Liberty of Conscience allowed freedom of worship and civic and political equality for Roman Catholics and Protestant Dissenters, and repeal of the Oath of Supremacy. However, it retained the Act of Uniformity; while James sought the abolition of penalties against liberty of conscience, he viewed the Church of Ireland as an essential element of his support and wanted to retain it, despite his own Catholicism.

Aftermath
After their defeat at the Boyne in July 1690, the Jacobites abandoned Dublin and retreated to Limerick, while James left Ireland. After the October 1691 Treaty of Limerick ended the war, all legislation enacted by the Patriot Parliament was declared void by the Parliament of England. The 1695 Irish Parliament passed an Act declaring all actions of the "late pretended Parliament" void and ordered its records destroyed.

For 19th-century Irish nationalists, its declaration of autonomy was the most important act of the 1689 Parliament.  Shortly before his death in 1843, Young Ireland leader Thomas Davis wrote a history of the Parliament, which explicitly linked it to the 1798 Rebellion. The term "Patriot Parliament" was first used in 1893 by Irish nationalist historian Sir Charles Gavan Duffy.

References

Sources

External links
 
 Members of Parliament at Dublin, 1689
 On-line text of "The Irish Parliament of James II" by TO Davis, 1843

Historical Irish legislatures
1689 in Ireland
Parliament of Ireland
Parliaments

689
James II of England
Williamite War in Ireland
17th-century elections in Ireland